The Screen Award for Best Special Effects is chosen by a distinguished panel of judges from the Indian Bollywood film industry and the winners are announced in January.

Winners

See also 
 Screen Awards

References 

Film awards for Best Visual Effects
Screen Awards